Ștefan Târnovanu (born 9 May 2000) is a Romanian professional footballer who plays as a goalkeeper for Liga I club FCSB and the Romania national team.

Club career

Early career
Târnovanu made his senior debut on 31 March 2018, aged 17, starting for Știința Miroslava in a 0–1 loss to Hermannstadt while on loan in the second league. On 30 November that year, he appeared for the first time in the Liga I for his boyhood club Politehnica Iași in a 1–1 home draw to Sepsi OSK.

Târnovanu was then again sent out on loan in the Liga II, moving to Sportul Snagov for the second half of the 2018–19 season.

FCSB
On 29 September 2019, it was announced that Târnovanu agreed a deal in advance to join FCSB the following summer. Politehnica Iași received €200,000 and also retained 15% interest on the capital gain of a possible future transfer. Târnovanu made his debut for the Roș-albaștrii on 19 May 2021, playing the full 90 minutes in a 0–1 league loss to Universitatea Craiova.

On 20 December, he kept a clean sheet in a draw against Sepsi OSK, being named one of the best players of the game by the Gazeta Sporturilor daily. Following some unconvincing performances of regular starter Andrei Vlad, Târnovanu became the first-choice goalkeeper at the club in March 2022.

International career
In June 2021, Târnovanu was selected by manager Mirel Rădoi in Romania's squad for the postponed 2020 Summer Olympics, but did not feature in any match.  

Târnovanu was called up to the senior team for the first time by coach Edward Iordănescu on 24 May 2022, for the four opening group games with Montenegro, Bosnia and Herzegovina, and Finland in the UEFA Nations League.

Personal life
In September 2018, media outlets reported that Târnovanu was temporarily removed from the Romania national under-19 team after shopping online with his roommate's bank card. The goalkeeper stated that "things were misunderstood" and he and Andrei Cristea-David are friends.

Career statistics

Club

International

Honours
FCSB
Supercupa României runner-up: 2020

References

External links

FCSB official profile 

2000 births
Living people
Sportspeople from Iași
Romanian footballers
Association football goalkeepers
Liga I players
Liga II players
CS Știința Miroslava players
FC Politehnica Iași (2010) players
CS Sportul Snagov players
FC Steaua București players
Romania youth international footballers
Romania under-21 international footballers
Olympic footballers of Romania
Footballers at the 2020 Summer Olympics